Peter Young (1927–2002) was a rugby union international who represented England from 1954 to 1955. He also captained his country.

Early life
Peter Young was born on 9 November 1927 in Bristol.

Rugby union career
Young made his international debut on 16 January 1954 at Twickenham in the England vs Wales match.
Of the 9 matches he played for his national side he was on the winning side on 4 occasions.
He played his final match for England on 19 March 1955 at Twickenham in the England vs Scotland match.

References

1927 births
2002 deaths
People educated at Clifton College
English rugby union players
England international rugby union players
Rugby union locks
Rugby union players from Bristol